The Anglesea River is a perennial river of the Corangamite catchment, located in the Otways region of the Australian state of Victoria.

Location and features

Etymology
In the Aboriginal Australian Wathawurrung language the name for the river is Kuarka-dorla, meaning "place to catch mullet".

The river was named after Anglesey, an island in Wales.

See also

 List of rivers of Victoria

References

External links

Corangamite catchment
Rivers of Barwon South West (region)
Otway Ranges